Naparima may refer to:

 Naparima Plain, the peneplain which occupies part of western south Trinidad
 Naparima (ward), one of the wards in County Victoria
 Naparima (seat), a seat in the Parliament of Trinidad and Tobago, east of San Fernando
 Naparima Hill, the proper name for San Fernando Hill
 Naparima College, an all-male secondary school in San Fernando
 Naparima Girls' High School, an all-female secondary school in San Fernando
 Naparima College, Tunapuna, the original name of Hillview College
 Naparima College, Siparia, the original name of Iere High School